Yousef Ghaderian (born 14 February 1993) is a Greco-Roman wrestler from Iran. Competing in the 80 kg division he won a bronze medal at the 2015 World Championships and a gold medal at the 2015 Asian Championships.

References 

Living people
Iranian male sport wrestlers
1993 births
World Wrestling Championships medalists
Wrestlers at the 2010 Summer Youth Olympics
Iranian Kurdish people
People from Saghez
Asian Wrestling Championships medalists
Islamic Solidarity Games medalists in wrestling
21st-century Iranian people
Islamic Solidarity Games competitors for Iran